Trogloconcha christinae is a species of sea snail, a marine gastropod mollusk in the family Larocheidae.

References

 Geiger D. 2003. Phylogenetic assessment of characters proposed for the generic classification of Recent Scissurellidae (Gastropoda : Vetigastropoda) with a description of one new genus and six new species from Easter Island and Australia. Molluscan Research 23(1): 21-83

Larocheidae
Gastropods described in 2003